IRN may refer to:

Input-referred noise
Independent Radio News, a news service to commercial radio stations in the United Kingdom
Independent Radio News (New Zealand), not affiliated with the United Kingdom company above
International Rivers Network, a non-profit environmental organization based in California, United States
Imperial Russian Navy, the navy of the Russian Empire
Iran
Indian-ringnecked parakeet (abbreviated IRN), the subspecies Psittacula krameri manillensis of the rose-ringed parakeet
Islamic Council Norway, Islamsk Råd Norge
Italian Royal Navy, the navy of the Kingdom of Italy